Anopina apicalis is a moth of the family Tortricidae. It is found in Puebla, Mexico.

References

Moths described in 2000
apicalis
Moths of Central America